Mbabane Government Hospital is the national hospital in Mbabane, Eswatini with 500 beds. Nkosazana Dlamini-Zuma worked at this hospital at a paediatric nurse in the 1980s. In 2007, the Minister for Health and Social Welfare, Njabulo Mabuza, banned the media from entering the hospital.

In September 2018 as the government had not paid suppliers the hospital ran out of food for patients.

References

Hospitals in Eswatini
Buildings and structures in Mbabane